Lotte Department Store is a Korean retail company established in 1979, and headquartered in Sogong-dong, Jung-gu, Seoul, South Korea. Lotte Department Store offers retail consumer goods and services and is one out of 8 business units of Lotte Shopping. Other Lotte retail companies include discount store Lotte Mart and supermarket Lotte Super.

References

External links

Lotte Department Store English Homepage

Department Store
Department stores of South Korea
Retail companies established in 1979
Food halls
South Korean companies established in 1979

de:Lotte (Unternehmen)#Handel